Orehovec, settlement in the Municipality of Šmarje pri Jelšah in eastern Slovenia.
 Orehovec, village in the Gorjanci Hills in the Municipality of Kostanjevica na Krki in Slovenia
 Sveti Petar Orehovec, municipality in the Koprivnica-Križevci County in Croatia.